Hand in Hand: A Benefit for Hurricane Relief was a one-hour, commercial-free benefit concert television special that aired simulcast in the United States on September 12, 2017, at 8 p.m. ET/CT live  from New York City, Nashville, San Antonio, and Los Angeles and tape delayed MT and PT.

During the hour it was on the air, the special raised $14 million for the relief efforts from the aftermath of Hurricane Harvey and Hurricane Irma. By evening's end the total was up to $44 million.
Organizations benefitting the relief include the United Way of Greater Houston, Rebuild Texas Fund, ASPCA, Habitat for Humanity, Best Friends, Direct Relief, Save the Children, Feeding Texas, Feeding Florida, and the Mayor's Fund for Hurricane Harvey Relief. On October 17, 2017, it was announced that benefits would now also go to the victims of Hurricane Maria, which occurred the week after the concert. The Hand in Hand Fund is managed by Comic Relief, Inc.

The concert was produced Scooter Braun and SB Projects, the same team who organized the One Love Manchester benefit with Ariana Grande.

To date, the benefit has raised over $55 million in donations.

Musical performances
 "Lean on Me" – Stevie Wonder with Victoria White, Marquist Taylor and Houston gospel choir
 "Stand by Me" – Usher and Blake Shelton
 "Hallelujah" (bilingual in the John Cale arrangement) – Tori Kelly and Luis Fonsi
 "Mercy" – Dave Matthews
 "With a Little Help From My Friends" (in the Joe Cocker arrangement) – Demi Lovato, Brad Paisley, Darius Rucker, and CeCe Winans
 "Texas" and "I Believe" – George Strait, Miranda Lambert, Chris Stapleton, Lyle Lovett, and Robert Earl Keen

Spoken segments

Beyoncé
Justin Bieber
Cher
George Clooney
Billy Crystal
Robert De Niro
Leonardo DiCaprio
Jimmy Fallon
Jamie Foxx
Jennifer Garner
Selena Gomez
Tom Hanks
Taraji P. Henson
Dwayne Johnson
Nicole Kidman
Matthew McConaughey
Dennis Quaid
Julia Roberts
Will Smith
Gwen Stefani
Barbra Streisand
Justin Timberlake
Sofía Vergara
Kerry Washington
Oprah Winfrey
Reese Witherspoon

Venues
 Times Square Studios, New York City
 Universal Studios Hollywood, Los Angeles
 Grand Ole Opry, Nashville, Tennessee
 Majestic Theatre, San Antonio

Broadcast networks

United States

Television 
ABC
BET
Bravo
CBS
CMT
E!
Fox
MTV
NBC
Oxygen
Univision

Radio
iHeartRadio
Sirius XM

Viewing figures

See also

 Shelter from the Storm: A Concert for the Gulf Coast (2005)
 Hurricane Sandy: Coming Together (2012)

References

External links

2017 in American television
American telethons
Benefit concerts in the United States
Hurricane Harvey
September 2017 events in the United States
Simulcasts
Hurricane Irma